Edmund Garrett may refer to:

Edmund H. Garrett (1853–1929), American illustrator and author, well known for his illustrations of the legends of King Arthur
Fydell Edmund Garrett (1865–1907), known as Edmund Garrett, British publicist, journalist and poet